Federico Pinedo (born 29 December 1955) is an Argentine politician, provisional president of the Argentine Senate between 2015 and 2019. He was in charge of the executive branch on 10 December 2015 until the assumption of Mauricio Macri on the same day.

As a chief of Republican Proposal in the lower house of National Congress of Argentina, he opposed same-sex marriage and legalization of abortion, representing the conservative vision of the party in different social policies.

References

1955 births
Living people
People from Buenos Aires
Acting presidents of Argentina
Members of the Argentine Senate for Buenos Aires
Members of the Argentine Chamber of Deputies elected in Buenos Aires
Republican Proposal politicians